One Well-Raised Daughter is a 2013 South Korean daily drama starring Park Han-byul, Lee Tae-gon, Jung Eun-woo and Yoon Se-in. It aired on SBS from December 2, 2013 to May 30, 2014 on Mondays to Fridays at 19:20 for 122 episodes.

Plot
The Jang family owns the Hwangso Soy Sauce Factory, which has been making soy sauce for two centuries. When the patriarch's son dies in a train crash, Jang Ha-na, the family's fourth daughter, is chosen to be its next successor. However, because of the tradition of passing the ownership of the company only to a male heir, Ha-na is raised as a boy and must disguise herself as the family son called "Jang Eun-sung" in order to inherit and prevent the factory from being taken over by her mother's scheming rival and her two children as well as a rival competitor.

Cast

Main
Park Han-byul as Jang Ha-na/Jang Eun-seong
Lee Tae-gon as Han Yoon-chan
Jung Eun-woo as Seol Do-hyun
Yoon Se-in as Jang Ra-hee

Supporting
Yoon Yoo-sun as Joo Hyo-sun
Ha Jae-sook as Jang Ha-myung
Park In-hwan as Jang Pan-ro
Kim Ji-young as Byun Jong-soon
Lee Hye-sook as Im Chung-ran
Kim Min-young as Ha-myung	
Kim Joo-young as Jang Ra-kong
Choi Jae-sung as Seol Jin-mook
Han Yoo-yi as Seol Do-eun
Choi Hyo-eun as Shin-hee
 Jo Woo-jin

Awards and nominations

References

External links
One Well-Raised Daughter official SBS website 

Seoul Broadcasting System television dramas
2013 South Korean television series debuts
2014 South Korean television series endings
Korean-language television shows
Cross-dressing in television
South Korean romance television series